Oak Orchard is an unincorporated community located in the town of Pensaukee, Oconto County, Wisconsin, United States.

References

Unincorporated communities in Oconto County, Wisconsin
Unincorporated communities in Wisconsin